The 2016 Women's Twenty20 Asia Cup was the sixth edition of the ACC Women's Asia Cup, organized by the Asian Cricket Council. It took place from 26 November to 4 December 2016, in Thailand, and was the second edition played as a 20-over tournament. Matches were played at the Asian Institute of Technology Ground and the Terdthai Cricket Ground (both located in Bangkok).

India were undefeated during the tournament, and defeated Pakistan by 17 runs in the final. Along with India and Pakistan, four other teams took part – Bangladesh, Sri Lanka, hosts Thailand, and Nepal (the latter two teams qualifying through the Women's World Cup Asia Qualifier). Bangladesh, India, Pakistan, and Sri Lanka had Twenty20 International (T20I) status, with matches featuring two of these sides being played as such. Matches featuring either Nepal or Thailand did not have T20I status.

Squads

Points table

Matches

1st match

2nd match

3rd match

4th match

5th match

6th match

7th match

8th match

9th match

10th match

11th match

12th match

13th match

14th match

15th match

Final

Statistics

Most runs
The top five runscorers are included in this table, ranked by runs scored and then by batting average.

Source: ESPNcricinfo

Most wickets

The top five wicket takers are listed in this table, ranked by wickets taken and then by bowling average.

Source: ESPNcricinfo

References

External links
 Series home at ESPN Cricinfo

2016
2016 in Thai sport
2016 in Asian sport
International cricket competitions in 2016–17
International women's cricket competitions in Thailand
2016 in women's cricket
November 2016 sports events in Asia
December 2016 sports events in Asia